Josephus Robertus Hendricus "Josef" van Schaik (31 January 1882 – 23 March 1962) was a Dutch politician of the defunct Roman Catholic State Party (RKSP) and later co-founder of the Catholic People's Party (KVP) now merged into the Christian Democratic Appeal (CDA) party and jurist. He was granted the honorary title of Minister of State on 15 March 1951.

Van Schaik worked as a teacher at a middle school in Arnhem from 1905 until 1906. He worked as a lawyer and prosecutor in Arnhem from 1906 until 1919, served as a judge at the court of Arnhem from 1910 until 1919, and worked as a lawyer and prosecutor in The Hague from 1919 until 1933.

Van Schaik became a Member of the House of Representatives after the death of Joseph van Nispen tot Sevenaer, taking office on 20 February 1917. After the election of 1929, Van Schaik was elected as Speaker of the House of Representatives, taking office on 18 September 1929. Following the election of 1933, Van Schaik was appointed as Minister of Justice in the Cabinet Colijn II and served as the De facto Deputy Prime Minister, taking office on 26 May 1933. The Cabinet Colijn II fell just two years later on 23 July 1935 and was replaced by the Cabinet Colijn III, with Van Schaik continuing as Minister of Justice and De facto Deputy Prime Minister, taking office on 31 July 1935. After the election of 1937, Van Schaik returned as a Member of the House of Representatives and became the Parliamentary leader of the Roman Catholic State Party in the House of Representatives on 8 June 1937. The Cabinet Colijn III was replaced by the Cabinet Colijn IV on 24 June 1937. Van Schaik was re-elected as Speaker of the House of Representatives following the appointment of Piet Aalberse Sr. as a Member of the Council of State, taking office on 11 November 1937. During World War II, Van Schaik continued to serve as the De jure Speaker of the House of Representatives, but in reality his political influence was marginalized and he spent most of the German occupation secluded.

Following the end of World War II, Queen Wilhelmina ordered a Recall of Parliament. Van Schaik remained in the House of Representatives and was again re-elected as Speaker of the House of Representatives. On 22 December 1945 the Roman Catholic State Party was renamed as the Catholic People's Party. Van Schaik was one of the co-founders and became the unofficial Deputy Leader of the Catholic People's Party. For the election of 1948 Van Schaik was one of the Lijsttrekkers (top candidates) of the Catholic People's Party. The Catholic People's Party held all of their seats and remained the largest party with 32 seats in the House of Representatives. The following cabinet formation resulted in a coalition agreement between the Catholic People's Party, the Labour Party (PvdA), the Christian Historical Union (CHU) and the People's Party for Freedom and Democracy (VVD), which formed the Cabinet Drees–Van Schaik, with Van Schaik appointed as Deputy Prime Minister and Minister for Constitutional Reform, taking office on 7 August 1948. Van Schaik served as acting Minister of Transport and Water Management from 7 August 1948 until 1 November 1948, until the installation of Derk Spitzen. Van Schaik served as acting Minister of the Interior from 15 June 1949 until 20 September 1949 following the appointment of Johan van Maarseveen as Minister of Colonial Affairs. The Cabinet Drees–Van Schaik fell on 24 January 1951, and shortly thereafter Van Schaik, per his request, was not considered for a ministerial post in the new cabinet. The Cabinet Drees–Van Schaik was replaced by the Cabinet Drees I on 15 March 1951.

Van Schaik remained active in politics. He was nominated as a Member of the Council of State, serving from 1 June 1951 until 1 February 1957 and served as Chairman of the Van Schaik Commission, a state commission that was tasked with constitutional reforms and decolonization, serving from 17 April 1950 until 15 January 1954. He also served on several state commissions on behalf of the government. Following the end of his active political career, he remained active as an advocate and lobbyist for small and medium-sized enterprises.

Van Schaik was known for his abilities as a consensus builder and negotiator. He continued to comment on political affairs as an elder statesman until his death.

Decorations

References

External links

  Mr. J.R.H. (Joop) van Schaik Parlement & Politiek

 
 

 

 
 

 

1882 births
1962 deaths
Catholic People's Party politicians
Commanders of the Order of the Netherlands Lion
Deputy Prime Ministers of the Netherlands
Dutch academic administrators
20th-century Dutch judges
Dutch lobbyists
Dutch prosecutors
Dutch nonprofit directors
Dutch political party founders
Dutch Roman Catholics
General League of Roman Catholic Caucuses politicians
Grand Croix of the Légion d'honneur
Grand Crosses of the Order of the Crown (Belgium)
Knights of the Holy Sepulchre
Knights Grand Cross of the Order of Orange-Nassau
Knights Grand Cross of the Order of St Gregory the Great
Members of the Council of State (Netherlands)
Members of the House of Representatives (Netherlands)
Ministers of Justice of the Netherlands
Ministers of the Interior of the Netherlands
Ministers of Transport and Water Management of the Netherlands
Ministers of State (Netherlands)
Ministers without portfolio of the Netherlands
Academic staff of Radboud University Nijmegen
Roman Catholic State Party politicians
Speakers of the House of Representatives (Netherlands)
People from Arnhem
People from Breda
People from Druten
Utrecht University alumni
20th-century Dutch civil servants
20th-century Dutch educators
20th-century Dutch politicians